Cinema is the sixteenth album by the Scottish hard rock band Nazareth, released in 1986 by Vertigo Records.

Track listing

Original CD bonus tracks

1997 Castle Communications remaster bonus tracks

2001 30th anniversary bonus tracks

2011 Salvo bonus tracks
BBC Friday Rock Show 14.10.1984:

The 2011 remastered CD release of Cinema was paired with The Catch

Personnel

Band members 
 Dan McCafferty - vocals
 Pete Agnew - bass guitar, back vocals
 Manny Charlton - guitars
 Darrell Sweet - drums, back vocals

Other credits 
 Eddie Delana - producer, engineer
 Calum Malcolm - emulator on "Cinema"
 Recorded at Pearl Sound Studios (Canton, Michigan), Cava Sound Workshops (Glasgow Scotland), Castle Sound Studios (Pentcaitland Scotland)
 Mixed at Jacobs Studios (Farnham England)

Chart performance

References 

1986 albums
Nazareth (band) albums
Vertigo Records albums